Joshua Elliot Eccles (born 6 April 2000) is an English professional footballer who plays as a midfielder for EFL Championship club Coventry City.

Whilst in the Coventry academy, Josh played for Yelvertoft Cricket Club, captaining the youth team to its first league win.

Career
Eccles started his career at the age of seven, by joining the youth system at Coventry City, where he signed his first professional contract in July 2018. Before making his debut in an EFL Trophy game against Cheltenham Town in November 2018.

He signed for Gillingham on a season-long loan on 17 September 2020, two days after featuring against the club in an EFL Cup match. On 6 January 2021, Eccles was recalled by the Sky Blues.

On 13 January 2023, Eccles extended his contract with Coventry City, signing a new deal until June 2027.

Career statistics

References

English footballers
Coventry City F.C. players
Gillingham F.C. players
Association football midfielders
Living people
2000 births
English Football League players
Footballers from Coventry